Treaty of Lyubutsk was a peace treaty signed in summer of 1372 between Algirdas, Grand Duke of Lithuania, and Dmitri Donskoi, Prince of Moscow. The treaty ended the Lithuanian–Muscovite War (1368–72) and resulted in a seven-year peace period.

Influence and power of the Grand Duchy of Moscow grew steadily and its interests clashed with those of Lithuania. After the Battle of Blue Waters in 1362 Lithuania took over Kiev and became direct neighbor of Moscow. Algirdas assisted Tver, chief rival of Moscow, and attempted to promote his brother-in-law Mikhail II of Tver to the throne of Vladimir, a long-time possession of Moscow. In 1372 Algirdas organized a third attack against Moscow. Other two attacks in 1368 and 1370 reached the city of Moscow, but did not succeed in taking the city's Kremlin. In 1372 Lithuanian army was stopped near Lyubutsk, a fort on the Oka River northeast of Tula. Lithuanian vanguard troops were defeated and had to retreat. Algirdas secured his position in steep hills and faced Dmitri's army. After a period of standoff, the peace treaty was concluded. Algirdas agreed to abandon the plans of promoting Mikhail thus ending Lithuania's assistance to Tver. The peace lasted for about seven years until 1379, when after the death of Algirdas in 1377 his eldest son Andrei of Polotsk allied himself with Moscow against Jogaila.

The raids to Moscow consumed many resources, but did not achieve any significant results. They strengthened Moscow's prestige and influence in Rus' and signified that Lithuanian eastward expansion into Slavic lands was coming to an end.

References

Lyubutsk
Lyubutsk
Lyubutsk
Lyubutsk
14th century in the Grand Duchy of Moscow
1372 in Europe
14th century in Lithuania